James Breckinridge (March 7, 1763May 13, 1833) was a Virginia lawyer and politician and a member of the Breckinridge family. He served in the Virginia House of Delegates, as well as the U.S. House of Representatives. He also fought in the American Revolutionary War and served as a brigadier-general during the War of 1812.

Family and early life
Breckinridge was born near Fincastle in Botetourt County in the Colony of Virginia. He was the son of Robert Breckinridge whose father had immigrated from Ireland. His mother was the former Leticia Preston. His brother was John Breckinridge and he was the great-great-great-uncle of John Bayne Breckinridge. He married Ann Cary Selden (daughter of Wilson Cary Selden & Elizabeth Jennings) born 1770 died 1843.

He studied under private tutors and during the Revolutionary War, he served in Colonel Preston's rifle regiment under General Nathanael Greene. He attended Washington College (now Washington and Lee University) and graduated from the College of William and Mary in 1785. He studied law and was admitted to the bar and practiced in Fincastle in 1787.

He built Breckinridge Mill in 1822, to replace an earlier mill he built in 1804. It was listed on the National Register of Historic Places in 1980, with a boundary increase in 2002.

Political career

Breckinridge served as a delegate to the Virginia House of Delegates intermittently between 1789 and 1824. He took a special interest in the construction of the Chesapeake and Ohio Canal. He was then elected as a Federalist to the Eleventh Congress and to the three succeeding Congresses (March 4, 1809 – March 3, 1817). He was an associate of Thomas Jefferson in the establishment of the University of Virginia and served as brigadier general in the War of 1812.

At one point he ran for governor of Virginia but was defeated by James Monroe.

Elections
1809; Breckinridge was elected to the U.S. House of Representatives with 56.72% of the vote, defeating Democrat-Republican Alexander Wilson.
1811; Breckinridge was re-elected with 58.4% of the vote, defeating Democrat-Republican Thomas L. Preston.
1813; Breckinridge was re-elected unopposed.
1815; Breckinridge was re-elected unopposed.

Death and burial
Breckinridge died at his country home, "Grove Hill," Botetourt County, Virginia, May 13, 1833, and was buried in the family burial plot on his estate near Fincastle.

References

1763 births
1833 deaths
People from Botetourt County, Virginia
Members of the Virginia House of Delegates
Virginia lawyers
Washington and Lee University alumni
College of William & Mary alumni
Continental Army soldiers
United States Army generals
American militiamen in the War of 1812
United States Army personnel of the War of 1812
Breckinridge family
Federalist Party members of the United States House of Representatives from Virginia
19th-century American politicians
18th-century American politicians
18th-century American lawyers
19th-century American lawyers
People of Virginia in the American Revolution